Blue Lightning is the twenty-first studio album released by Yngwie Malmsteen in 2019.

Track listing

Personnel
Yngwie J. Malmsteen - guitar, bass, vocal, keyboard, Hammond B3
Lawrence Lannerbach - drums

Charts

References

Yngwie Malmsteen albums
2019 albums